Faina Georgievna Ranevskaya (born Faina Girschevna Feldman,  —  19 July 1984), is recognized as one of the greatest Soviet actresses in both tragedy and comedy. She was also famous for her aphorisms.

She acted in plays by Anton Chekhov, Aleksandr Ostrovsky, Maxim Gorky, Ivan Krylov, Fyodor Dostoevsky, Leo Tolstoy, and others. Unfortunately, our judgement of her theater performances must come mostly from photos as only her three final performances of Make Way for Tomorrow by Vina Delmar, Truth is Good, but Happiness is Better by Aleksandr Ostrovsky, The Curious Savage by John Patrick were filmed. Faina Ranevskaya is more known to a wide audience as a cinema actress by her performance in such films as Pyshka (Boule de Suif), The Man in a Shell, Mechta (Dream), Vesna (Springtime), Cinderella, Elephant and String and many more.

Biography 

She was born as Faina Feldman (Фельдман) to a wealthy Jewish family in the city of Taganrog. Her father, Girsch Haimovich Feldman, owned a dry-ink factory, several buildings, a shop and the steamboat "Saint Nicolas". He was the head of Taganrog synagogue and a founder of a Jewish asylum for the aged. Faina's mother, Milka Rafailovna (née Zagovaylova), was a great admirer of literature and art. That and her passion for Chekhov influenced Faina's love of art, poetry, music, and theater. There were three other children in the family - two brothers and an older sister named Bella.

Faina Feldman attended the elementary school classes at the Mariinskaya Gymnasium for Girls, and then received regular home education. She was given music, singing, foreign languages lessons. Faina loved reading. 

Her passion for theater began when she was 14. Her attendance of Chekhov's The Cherry Orchard at the Moscow Art Theater was an experience that had great impact on her. Her pseudonym "Ranevskaya," which later became her official surname, also came from that theater visit.

In 1915 she left Taganrog for Moscow to pursue a career in the theater. Faina became estranged from her family over her choice of career, which they apparently rejected. She started as an extra actor in crowd or background scenes at the Summer Theater in Malakhovka near Moscow in 1915, where she also had a dacha.

The Feldman family emigrated in 1917, but Faina decided to stay and continued her acting career, working in the theaters of Kerch, Rostov on Don, at the mobile theater "The First Soviet Theater" in Crimea, also in Baku, Arkhangelsk, Smolensk and other cities.

In 1931 Ranevskaya acted at the Chamber Theater.

The film Pyshka (known as Boule de Suif in the U.S.), directed by Mikhail Romm, marked her debut as a film actress in 1934. It was a silent black and white film based on the novel Boule de Suif by Guy de Maupassant, in which she starred as Madame Loiseau. Although the film was silent, Ranevskaya learned several sayings of Madame Loiseau in French from the original novel by Maupassant. Romain Rolland, a French writer who visited the Soviet Union in the 1930s, loved the film, and his favorite actor in the movie was Faina Ranevskaya.  At his request, the Pyshka (Boule de Suif) was shown in French cinemas, where it became a box-office success. Ranevskaya played on stage of the Central Academic Theatre of the Russian Army (1935-1939), Drama Theater, now Mayakovsky Theater (1943-1949), Moscow Pushkin Drama Theatre (1955-1963), and finally Mossovet Theater (1949-1955, 1963-1983), where she worked with Yury Zavadsky.

The actress was awarded the Stalin Prize for outstanding creative achievements on stage in 1949, and in 1951 for her work in the film U nih est' Rodina (They Have Their Motherland), directed by Vladimir Legoshin and Alexandre Feinzimmer. In 1961 Faina Ranevskaya was awarded the title of People's Artist of the USSR.

The actress died in 1984 in Moscow and was buried at the Donskoe Cemetery. A memorial plate dedicated to Ranevskaya was placed on her birthhouse in the city of Taganrog on August 29, 1986.

In 1992 British "Who's Who" encyclopedia named Ranevskaya among the world's Top Ten Actors of the 20th century. That was done despite the fact that the actress had never played a major part in a movie: all her roles were supporting ones. In a newspaper article, one of the Soviet movie industry apparatchiks explained her lack of main roles by Faina Ranevskaya's "typical Semitic" face features.

On May 16, 2008, a Ranevskaya Monument was inaugurated in Taganrog in front of actress's birth house on Ulitsa Frunze 10 within the framework of the International Ranevskaya Theater Festival "The Great Province"*.

In 2017 it was announced that Faina Ranevskaya's birth house in Taganrog will re-open its doors as a museum.

Filmography 

 1934 —  Boule de Suif (Пышка) as Madame Loiseau
 1938 —  The Ballad of Cossack Golota (Дума про казака Голоту)
 1939 —  Man in a Shell (Человек в футляре)
 1939 —  Engineer Kochin's Error (Ошибка инженера Кочина)
 1939 —  The Foundling (Подкидыш)
 1940 —  The Beloved (Любимая девушка)
 1941 —  The Dream (Мечта)
 1943 —  The New Adventures of Schweik (Новые похождения Швейка)
 1944 —  The Wedding (Свадьба)
 1945 —  Heavenly Slug (Небесный тихоход)
 1947 —  Private Aleksandr Matrosov (Рядовой Александр Матросов)
 1947 —  Springtime (Весна)
 1947 —  Cinderella (Золушка)
 1949 —  Encounter at the Elbe	(Встреча на Эльбе) as Mrs. McDermot
 1949 —  They Have a Motherland (У них есть Родина)
 1958 — A Girl with a Guitar (Девушка с гитарой)
 1960 —  Be Careful, Grandma! (Осторожно, бабушка!)
 1964 —  An Easy Life (Лёгкая жизнь)
 1965 —  Today, New Side Show (Сегодня - новый аттракцион)

Ranevskaya's aphorisms 

 Life is a short promenade, just before the eternal sleep.
 Solitude is when you have a telephone but the only ringing comes from the alarm clock.
 Life is a sky-dive: out of a cunt, into the grave.
 Ageing is tedious, but it is the only way to live long.
 I spent all my life swimming in a toilet-bowl, in the butterfly style.
 There are people with God inside, there are people with the devil inside, and there are people with only helminths inside!
 To star in a bad movie is as if to spit into eternity.
 God has made women pretty, so that men can like them, and silly, so that they can like men.
 You won't believe how old I am - I even remember some decent people!
 (Asked about her well-being) At night everything aches, especially conscience.
 An actor has no inconveniences if it is necessary for the role.
 I'm watching this movie for the fourth time and let me tell you, today the actors played like never before.
 Say and think about me whatever you like. When have you seen a cat interested in the mice's opinion about it?
 (After recovering from a heart attack) If the patient really wants to live, the doctors are powerless.
 (Answering how to lose weight effectively) Eat anything and whenever you like, but only naked in front of a mirror. 
 Animals that are rare have been put into the red book, and those that are plentiful - into the cooking book.
 Condoms are white because white color fattens.
 A man only blushes twice: the first time when he can't the second time, and the second time when he can't the first time.
 A real man is the one who remembers your birthday and also does not remember your age. 
 Those obnoxious journalists! Half the lies they tell about me aren't even true!
 Damn nineteenth century upbringing: I can't stand up when men are sitting.
 Nowadays when someone shies away from saying that they don't want to die, they say: "I want to live to see what happens next". As if, if not for that, they'd be all for dying. 
 (Said in late 1970s) It's dreadful when you are eighteen inside, when beautiful music, poetry, art delights you ... and they say it's your time, and you haven't even done anything, and you feel like beginning to live!
"Homosexuality is not a perversion. Perversions are field hockey or ice ballet."

References

External links 
 
  Website about Faina Ranevskaya

1896 births
1984 deaths
20th-century Russian actresses
Actors from Taganrog
People from Don Host Oblast
Aphorists
Jewish Russian comedians
Honored Artists of the RSFSR
People's Artists of the RSFSR
People's Artists of the USSR
Stalin Prize winners
Recipients of the Order of Lenin
Recipients of the Order of the Red Banner of Labour
Jewish actresses
Russian film actresses
Russian stage actresses
Soviet film actresses
Soviet Jews
Soviet stage actresses
Burials at Donskoye Cemetery
Jewish Russian actors